Darshan (The Road to Graceland) is the second of three collaborative productions of David Sylvian and Robert Fripp. It is a remix album; the first two tracks are remixes of the original song "Darshan" from their first album The First Day. The original version, written by David Sylvian, Robert Fripp, Trey Gunn and David Bottrill, is reissued here as final track. The first track is a remix by the Grid, and the second track—called "Darshana"—is a “reconstruction” by The Future Sound of London. It was released on 6 December 1993 as EP and CD Single on Virgin Records (SYLCD1 and VJCP 20013 in Japan).

Track listing
"Darshan (Translucent Remix by The Grid)"  (Sylvian, Fripp, Gunn, Bottrill) - Remixed by The Grid – 16:07 
"Darshana" (Sylvian, Fripp, Gunn, Bottrill, Cobain, Dougans) - Reconstructed by The Future Sound of London – 10:11 
"Darshan (The Road to Graceland)" (Sylvian, Fripp, Gunn, Bottrill) – 17:50

Personnel
 David Sylvian – vocals, guitars, keyboard instruments, tapes
 Robert Fripp – guitars, frippertronics
 Trey Gunn – grand and tenor chapman stick, vocals
 Jerry Marotta – drums, percussion instruments
 Marc Anderson – percussion instruments
 David Bottrill – treatments, sampled percussion, computer programming

David Sylvian albums
Robert Fripp albums
1993 albums
Albums produced by Robert Fripp
Virgin Records albums